Temnothorax brunneus is a species of ant in genus  Temnothorax, that can be found in Algeria and Morocco.

References

External links

Myrmicinae
Hymenoptera of Africa
Insects described in 1985
Taxonomy articles created by Polbot
Taxobox binomials not recognized by IUCN